Sayadaw U Ottama (Uttama; 28 December 1879 – 9 September 1939) was a Theravada Buddhist monk, author, and a leader of the Burmese independence movement during British colonial rule. The ethnic Rakhine (Arakanese) monk was imprisoned several times by the British colonial government for his anti-colonialist political activities.

Biography

Early life
He was born Paw Tun Aung, son of U Mra and Daw Aung Kwa Pyu, in Rupa, Sittwe District, in western Burma on 28 December 1879. Paw Tun Aung assumed the religious name Ottama when he entered the Buddhist monkhood.

Education
Ashin Ottama studied in Calcutta for three years. He then travelled around India, and to France and Egypt.

In January 1907, he went to Japan, where he taught Pali and Sanskrit at the Academy of Buddhist Science in Tokyo. He then travelled to  Korea, Manchuria, Port Arthur, China, Annam, Cambodia, Thailand, Sri Lanka, and India. In Saigon, he met with an exiled former Burmese prince, Myin Kun (who led a rebellion along with Prince Myin Khondaing in 1866 and assassinated the heir to the Burmese Crown, Crown Prince Kanaung).

Anti-colonial and political activities
Upon his return to British Burma, U Ottama started his political activities, toured the country, lecturing for YMBA (Young Men's Buddhist Association), and giving anti-colonial speeches. In 1921, he was arrested for his infamous "Craddock, Get Out!" speech against the Craddock Scheme by Sir Reginald Craddock, then Governor of British Burma. Repeatedly imprisoned on charges of sedition, he carried on. Ottama was one of the first monks to enter the political arena and the first person in British Burma to be imprisoned as a result of making a political speech, followed by a long line of nationalists such as Aung San and U Nu. According to academics; between 1921 and 1927, U Ottama spent more time in prison than outside.

While Ashin Ottama did not hold any post in any organization, he encouraged and participated in many peaceful demonstrations and strikes against British rule. An admirer of Mahatma Gandhi, he did not advocate the use of violence.

He represented the Indian National Congress at the funeral of Dr. Sun Yat-Sen in June 1929. The only time he held a post was as leader of the All India Hindu Mahasabhas in 1935.

Demise
U Ottama died in Rangoon Hospital on 9 September 1939.

Notes

References

External links
Irrawaddy.org: Commemoration of Monk's Death Muted in Arakan State — 9 September 2008.

Burmese Buddhist monks
Theravada Buddhist monks
1879 births
1939 deaths
Burmese activists
Burmese prisoners and detainees
Burmese Theravada Buddhists
Burmese writers
Burmese people of Rakhine descent
People from Rakhine State
People from Sittwe
Rakhine
20th-century Buddhists